Blacktown International Sportspark (BISP) (formally known as Blacktown Olympic Park) is a multi-sports venue located in Rooty Hill, a suburb in Sydney, Australia. The venue includes two cricket grounds, which have also been used for Australian rules football, an athletics track and field, three baseball diamonds, two soccer fields, four softball diamonds, administration centers and park land.

It was constructed for the 2000 Sydney Olympics to host softball and baseball events. The facilities have since been used as a training and administrative base for the Greater Western Sydney Giants from 2010 to 2012, and for the Western Sydney Wanderers FC since 2012. Since 2010 the Sydney Blue Sox of the Australian Baseball League have used the main baseball stadium as their home field.

Facilities
 Blacktown Baseball Stadium
 Blacktown ISP Oval
 Blacktown Softball Stadium
 Blacktown Football Park

Australian Rules Football & Cricket Centre 
The Australian Rules Football & Cricket centre was constructed in 2008. It features two ovals for Australian Rules Football & Cricket, stadium, function facilities and an indoor practice centre for Cricket. The official opening of the centre was held in on 22 August 2009 with the Mayor of Blacktown City, Councillor Charlie Lowles joined by Chief Executive Officers from AFL NSW/ACT and Cricket NSW.

Greater Western Sydney Giants
Greater Western Sydney Giants (GWS) had a permanent presence at Blacktown from 2010 to 2014. After Blacktown Councils spent $27 million on an AFL stadium & training facility, GWS abandoned the facility, in favour of a $45m facility that built by the NSW Government at Sydney Olympic Park, Homebush in Sydney's inner west, that also included an upgrade to the Sydney Showground Stadium at Sydney Olympic Park. The club has used the stadium for AFL Women's and men's reserves games in the Victorian Football League.

Blacktown Football Park
The combined football facilities on the southern side are known as "Blacktown Football Park", and are the Blacktown Spartans home ground and the Wanderers Centre Of Football. In addition to two broadcast level boutique stadiums, there are another dozen football pitches and the Wanderers administrative & training base.

Blacktown Spartans
A boutique stadium at the facility hosts National Premier League fixtures for Blacktown Spartans FC. There is a small grandstand with the player facilities, seating and a canteen. The far side has metal bench railings while the two ends are slight elevated grassy hills.

Western Sydney Wanderers
When the Wanderers started in 2012 the club used the Athletics Centre grandstand as temporary offices and the grassed middle of the field as their training pitch, with some pre-season games played on it. The youth team would also use the Spartans stadium for Youth League & NPL fixtures.

In 2014, Western Sydney Wanderers began the process of building a centre of excellence, consisting of a training base, offices and their youth academy at Blacktown International Sportspark. As part of the multimillion-dollar elite training base and academy, purpose-built grass playing fields, administration facilities, medical rooms and offices on the southern side of the precinct were built. The $15 million club funded project ran into a land rights issue that delayed the completion until 2019. The main pitch has a 500 capacity grandstand and the playing surface replicates the one at the Western Sydney Stadium.

In addition to being the training facility for the club it also hosts senior team pre-season matches, the W-League team, the youth side in the National Premier League system and junior league matches. The Wanderers first W-League match was a 2-1 win vs the Newcastle Jets on Saturday 2 January 2021, with Rosea Galea scoring both goals for the home side. The youth team defeated the Northern Tigers by 3-1 on Sunday 21 March 2021 at the ground. It has also been regularly used for the Wanderers NPL NSW team, and in May 2022 it hosted a competitive game for the A-League Men's team for the first time, with the Wanderers losing an 2022 Australia Cup play-off qualifier match against the Brisbane Roar.

Cricket
The three-day match between Cricket Australia XI and New Zealanders in October 2015 was abandoned after concerns over the pitch, New Zealand apparently refusing to bat because of the dangerous state of the wicket. In that match, Ryan Carters (209) and Aaron Finch (288 not out) scored 503 for the opening wicket and the match score remained as Cricket Australia XI 503/1 (dec). The stand easily eclipsed the previous Australian record of 456 set by openers Ernie Mayne and Bill Ponsford for Victoria state in 1923–24.

The Indian cricket team in Australia in 2020–21 tour saw the visiting Indian team use the cricket ground as their Covid lockdown training area.

Proposed developments
As part of Australia's unsuccessful 2018–2022 FIFA World Cup bid, the athletics track at the western end of the park was proposed to be developed into a soccer stadium named Blacktown Stadium. The stadium would have had 41,000-seat, a figure which would be downgraded to 26,000 post-tournament.

See also

2000 Summer Olympics venues

References

External links
Official website

Australian rules football grounds
Cricket grounds in Australia
Baseball venues in Australia
Sports venues in Sydney
Softball venues in Australia
Olympic baseball venues
Venues of the 2000 Summer Olympics
1999 establishments in Australia
Sports venues completed in 1999
AFL Women's grounds
Women's Big Bash League
Sports complexes in Australia
A-League Women stadiums